Dettwiller is a commune in the Bas-Rhin department in Grand Est in north-eastern France.

Dettwiller was historically known for shoe production. An Adidas factory was in operation between the 1960s into the 1980s.

See also
 Communes of the Bas-Rhin department

References

External links 
 

Bas-Rhin communes articles needing translation from French Wikipedia
Communes of Bas-Rhin